The Mixed time trial T1-2 road cycling event at the 2012 Summer Paralympics took place on September 5 at Brands Hatch. Nineteen riders from sixteen nations competed. The race distance was 8 km.

Results

References

X Mixed road time trial T1-2